Woodstock is a town in Oxford County, Maine, United States. The population was 1,352 at the 2020 census. The village of Bryant Pond, on State Route 26 in the northern part of Woodstock, is the town's urban center and largest settlement.

History

Woodstock was first settled in about 1808 as Plantation Number Three.  In 1814, a petition was sent to the Massachusetts General Court of Boston that requested the plantation be incorporated into a town called Sparta.  Massachusetts Governor Caleb Strong approved the petition on February 7, 1815, to establish the town of Woodstock.  It is unclear why the name Woodstock was chosen.

Geography
The area within the town limits of Woodstock is forested and mountainous. The town includes most of Lake Christopher (Bryant Pond).

Adjacent municipalities
 Milton, Maine (north)
 Peru, Maine (northeast)
 Sumner, Maine (east)
 West Paris, Maine (southeast)
 Greenwood, Maine (west)
 Bethel, Maine (northwest)

Demographics

2010 census
As of the census of 2010, there were 1,277 people, 546 households, and 377 families living in the town. The racial makeup of the town was 98.4% White, 0.1% African American, 0.4% Native American, 0.1% Asian, and 1.0% from two or more races. Hispanic or Latino of any race were 0.4% of the population.

There were 546 households, of which 27.1% had children under the age of 18 living with them, 55.1% were married couples living together, 7.7% had a female householder with no husband present, 6.2% had a male householder with no wife present, and 31.0% were non-families. 24.4% of all households were made up of individuals, and 11.6% had someone living alone who was 65 years of age or older. The average household size was 2.34 and the average family size was 2.71.

The median age in the town was 46.2 years. 19.1% of residents were under the age of 18; 5.5% were between the ages of 18 and 24; 23.2% were from 25 to 44; 33.6% were from 45 to 64; and 18.5% were 65 years of age or older. The gender makeup of the town was 50.0% male and 50.0% female.

2000 census
As of the census of 2000, there were 1,307 people, 525 households, and 371 families living in the town. There were 842 housing units at an average density of 18.4 per square mile (7.1/km). The racial makeup of the town was 98.85% White, 0.15% Native American, 0.08% Asian, and 0.92% from two or more races. Hispanic or Latino of any race were 0.54% of the population.

There were 525 households, out of which 30.1% had children under the age of 18 living with them, 59.0% were married couples living together, 7.6% had a female householder with no husband present, and 29.3% were non-families. 23.8% of all households were made up of individuals, and 7.4% had someone living alone who was 65 years of age or older.  The average household size was 2.47 and the average family size was 2.89.

In the town, the population was spread out, with 24.6% under the age of 18, 5.9% from 18 to 24, 28.0% from 25 to 44, 26.2% from 45 to 64, and 15.2% who were 65 years of age or older.  The median age was 40 years. For every 100 females, there were 106.8 males.  For every 100 females age 18 and over, there were 99.0 males.

The median income for a household in the town was $35,642, and the median income for a family was $38,750. Males had a median income of $28,889 versus $22,273 for females. The per capita income for the town was $16,698.  About 5.5% of families and 9.3% of the population were below the poverty line, including 14.3% of those under age 18 and 5.9% of those age 65 or over.

See also
 Lake Christopher (Bryant Pond)
 Western Maine Mountains

References

External links
Community history
Bryant Pond Telephone Museum
 Maine Genealogy: Woodstock, Oxford County, Maine

Towns in Oxford County, Maine
Towns in Maine